Lucid Druid is a Celtic fusion band that formed in Clearwater, Florida in 2003.  The band self-proclaims their sound as "Traditional Celtic Music of the early 21st century," and "Eclectic World-Fusion Music," describing their multi-faceted and jam-induced music.

Highlighting the original compositions of two-time World Champion bagpiper Adam Quinn (formerly of the Simon Fraser University Pipe Band), the band is composed of 5 core members who integrate the sounds of bagpipes, guitar, double bass, didgeridoo & Scottish snare with a variety of African drums to create a unique sound.  The music of Lucid Druid fuses the qualities of traditional & modern Scottish music with elements of rock, jazz, country, and traditional African rhythms.  Their unusual arrangements and exploratory jams make their music un-comparable to anything else being produced today in the genre of Celtic fusion music.

The band still maintains their original lineup which consists of the following members:
Adam Quinn - Bagpipes, Degerpipes, Shuttlepipes, Didgeridoo, Clarinet
Steve Turner - Ashiko, Djembe, Drum Set, Didgeridoo
Joe Porter - Double Bass, Electric Bass
Doug White - Scottish Snare, Drum Set, Roto-Tams, Bongos
Sebastian Deledda - Guitars

Discography
 Anecdota (2004)

External links
Official Site
Lucid Druid on MySpace

Musical groups established in 2003
Celtic music groups
Musical groups from Florida